Sovfoto was established in 1932 as the only agency to represent Soviet photojournalism in America. It continues today as a commercial entity Sovfoto/Eastfoto. Collections from its archive are held also at MacLaren Art Centre in Barrie, Canada which in 2001 was donated 23,116 vintage gelatin silver prints dating from 1936 to 1957, while University of Massachusetts Amherst holds the Tass Sovfoto Photograph Collection, 1919–1963, the majority being from 1943–1963.

Establishment

Sovfoto agency was originally established by the USSR in New York in the early 1930s to distribute Soviet press photography throughout North America.

Clientele 
All were printed, and often retouched, in the USSR with English captions as they were intended for a North American audience. Associated Press and International New Services and other major wire agencies paid a subscription fee to license the material, and offered it to illustrated magazines like Life, Time and Newsweek and Look, to newspapers, school textbook publishers, and also to communist-aligned and communist-sympathetic publications, as well as selling to the State Department and various branches of the Armed Forces as the only source of regular visual reportage on the Soviet Union. 

Three Sovfoto pictures appeared (credited to the agency) in MoMA's 1955 exhibition curated by Edward Steichen, The Family of Man. Sponsored by America's own propaganda unit the United States Information Agency, it toured the world and was attended by 9 million visitors. It was included in the Moscow trade fair at Sokolniki Park, the scene of Soviet Premier Nikita Khrushchev and United States Vice President Richard Nixon's 'Kitchen Debate' over the relative merits of communism and capitalism.

New York office 
After World War II, Sovfoto continued, adding imagery from Eastern European countries of the Communist bloc as well as China. The agency started doing business as Sovfoto/Eastfoto in the late 1940s, moving offices several times under a series of American owners, including Helen Black (at 11 West Forty-second Street, New York City 18, then 15 West 44th Street) up to 1952, Edwin S. Smith to 1964 (at 24 West 45th Street), then Liuba Solov at 25 West 43rd Street. Solov managed the business until 1974 when Leah Siegel took ownership, moving in 1987 to 225 West 34th Street Suite 1505, and employing Victoria Edwards who bought the company in the early 1990s. Edwards’ son Vanya took over upon her retirement and is the current owner/manager.

McCarthy-era suspicions 
As a Communist bloc agency, Sovfoto came under suspicion during the McCarthy era. When Sovfoto released photographs of purported biological warfare committed by the Americans, the then-owner Edwin Smith was brought before the House Un-American Activities Committee to testify on his role in their publication. At the time of his ownership as ‘Foreign Principal’, the Report of the Attorney General to the Congress of the United States on the Administration of the Foreign Agents Registration Act of 1938 as Amended June 1951, for the Calendar Year 1955, notes that ‘Propaganda photographs (for the U.S.S.R.) are distributed by Edwin S. Smith, doing business under the name of Sovfoto Agency’ as well as ‘propaganda material from Communist China’. Smith (1891–1975) was owner and manager of Am-Rus Literary and Music Agency, also Sovfoto and Eastfoto Agency from 1952–64, and represented legations and press and photo agencies Mezhdunarodnaja Kniga, Moscow; Czechopress, Prague; China Photo Service, Peking; Agerpress, Bucharest; Zentral Bild, East Berlin; Hungarian Review Photo Service (formerly Hungarian Bulletin), Budapest; Legation of the Hungarian People's Republic; Czechoslovakian Embassy; Legation of the People's Republic of Rumania; Polish Embassy; Czechoslovak Life, Prague; Cartimex (previously Centrul de Librarii Si Difuzare a Cartii "IMEX"), Bucharest;  and Artia, Prague. The agency received $40,872.75 from sale of photographs in 1955.

Current operation 
Until the fall of the Communist/Soviet bloc, Sovfoto remained the exclusive legitimate source of news photography from the Communist countries and it continues to represent ITAR-TASS in Russia and Xinhua in China and others, while maintaining the historical archive. The Agency continues to operate from 263 West 20th St. #3 New York 10011 under the management of Vanya Edwards.

Archive

The Sovfoto archiv holds the largest collection of photographs of Stalinist USSR outside of the state archives in Moscow. Furthermore, it includes images of Russia from the time of the Tsars, through Lenin, Stalin, Khrushchev, Gorbachev, and Yeltsin, World War II and Militaria, the space program, and a wide range of areas from Soviet society. Dr. Margarita Tupitsyn, curator and author of The Soviet Photograph, 1924–1937 wrote:

 "The Sovfoto archive is of unquestionable status....Many of the photographs stand out as artistically remarkable and strong images as well as documentation of the human experience... The Sovfoto archive presents a visual depository for rich interdisciplinary studies, including photography, sociology, psychology and history...The annotations on the back of each photograph further enables the researcher to delve into invaluable historical layers of knowledge that would require a long time to find in other sources...The Sovfoto archive is the only one of its kind in North America."

For anthropologists, for example, the archive provides visual evidence; in Ruth Benedict's study 'Child rearing in Eastern European Countries,' Sovfoto imagery showed the prevalence of swaddling.

The Sovfoto photographs present the state-sanctioned, propagandistic promotion of the progress and achievements of communism. In 1950 Newsweek generated controversy around a Sovfoto picture of 70-year old Prime Minister Stalin casting his ballot for the March 12 Soviet elections; they showed that a head shot of Stalin from years before had been 'simply pasted' into the news photo. Conversely, in 1956, Stewart Alsop in The Courier-Journal demonstrated how reliable information on Soviet weapons programs could be obtained from Sovfoto images. The magazine Aviation Week was called to The Pentagon for publishing 'top secret' photographs of flights over Moscow by the new Soviet heavy bomber, the Bison, the existence of which had been denied as 'fake' by Secretary of Defense Charles E. Wilson, to which charge the Aviation Week editor protested that they had simply obtained the pictures from Sovfoto. 

Nevertheless, they also constitute historical record. When Lillian Hellman was writing the screenplay for The North Star she relied on Sovfoto location pictures for the recreation of Ukrainian cooperative Kamenetz Podolsk. 

At the outbreak of World War II, many Soviet photographers became war correspondents, incorporating the photographic invention of the revolutionary avant-garde in documenting the lives and deaths of Russian troops, conflict, destruction and German atrocities. Sovfoto coverage of the Red Army's advance produced by Russian photographers turned war correspondents arrived at Associated Press offices in New York by radio from Moscow as early as August 1944. These were the first evidence of the Holocaust; one showing residents of Lublin surrounding a pit filled with bodies of those killed by the Germans who occupied the city; another, according to the Sovfoto caption accompanying it, showed: "The Lublin camp of annihilation. In their well-built cremation ovens, the Hitlerites daily burnt the bodies of those whom they tortured to death in the camp." During the Korean War, Eastfoto images of American POW's distributed by Sovfoto led to the identification of at least two of the US combatants pictured.

The photographers
The archive contains images taken by many anonymous photographers, as well as foremost Soviet photographers, documenting a period of history in the twentieth century which has had a very lasting impact. After the crackdown of 1932, many of the Soviet Union's leading avant-garde photographers found that their only available means of expression was press photography. The Sovfoto archive includes images from many Soviet photographers who have become historically important:

References

External links 
 Sovfoto/Eastfoto website 

Photojournalism organizations
Mass media in the Soviet Union
Press release agencies
News agencies based in the United States
Photography in the Soviet Union
Propaganda in the Soviet Union
Soviet photographers
Photography companies of Russia
Soviet Union–United States relations
Photo archives in Canada
Photo archives in the United States
Photo agencies